The Archdiocese of Cotonou is the Metropolitan See for the Ecclesiastical province of Cotonou in Benin.

History
 26 June 1883: Established as Apostolic Prefecture of Dahomey from the Apostolic Vicariate of Benin Coast, Nigeria 
 25 May 1901: Promoted as Apostolic Vicariate of Dahomey 
 13 May 1948: Renamed as Apostolic Vicariate of Ouidah
 14 September 1955: Promoted as Metropolitan Archdiocese of Cotonou

Special churches
The seat of the archbishop is Cathédrale Notre Dame in Cotonou .  There is also a Minor Basilica at the Basilique de l'Immaculée Conception in Cotonou.

Bishops
Metropolitan Archbishops of Cotonou, in reverse chronological order
Archbishop Antoine Ganye:since 21 August 2010; formerly Bishop of the Roman Catholic Diocese of Dassa-Zoume, Benin 
Archbishop Marcel Honorat Léon Agboton: 5 March 2005 - 21 August 2010
Archbishop Nestor Assogba: 29 October 1999 – 5 March 2005
Archbishop Isidore de Souza: 27 December 1990 – 13 March 1999
Archbishop Christophe Adimou: 28 June 1971 – 27 December 1990
Archbishop Bernardin Gantin: 5 January 1960 – 28 June 1971, appointed Official of the Congregation for the Evangelization of Peoples; future Cardinal

Coadjutor archbishop
Isidore de Souza (1981-1990)

Auxiliary bishop
Bernardin Gantin (1956-1960), appointed Archbishop here; future Cardinal

Other priests of this diocese who became bishops
Lucien Monsi-Agboka, appointed Bishop of Abomey in 1963
Martin Adjou Moumouni, appointed Bishop of N’Dali in 1999
Eugène Cyrille Houndékon, appointed Bishop of Abomey in 2007

Suffragan Dioceses
Abomey
Dassa-Zoumé
Lokossa
Porto Novo

See also
 Catholic Church in Benin
 List of Roman Catholic dioceses in Benin

References

External links

 Website of the Archdiocese of Cotonou
 GCatholic.org 

Cotonou
Cotonou
Cotonou
Cotonou
 
Cotonou